Slavětín may refer to places in the Czech Republic:

Slavětín (Havlíčkův Brod District), a municipality and village in the Vysočina Region
Slavětín (Louny District), a market town in the Ústí nad Labem Region
Slavětín (Olomouc District), a municipality and village in the Olomouc Region
Slavětín nad Metují, a municipality and village in the Hradec Králové Region